Amaury García Moreno (born 19 December 2001) is a Mexican professional footballer who plays as a midfielder for Liga MX club UNAM.

Career statistics

Club

Notes

References

External links

Amaury García at Soccerway

Living people
2001 births
Mexican footballers
Association football midfielders
Club Universidad Nacional footballers
Liga MX players
Footballers from Mexico City